The Ringelblum Archive is a collection of documents from the World War II Warsaw Ghetto, collected and preserved by a group known by the codename Oyneg Shabbos (in Modern Israeli Hebrew, Oneg Shabbat), led by Jewish historian Emanuel Ringelblum.  The group, which included historians, writers, rabbis, and social workers, was dedicated to chronicling life in the Ghetto during the German occupation. They worked as a team, collecting documents and soliciting testimonies and reports from dozens of volunteers of all ages. The materials submitted included essays, diaries, drawings, wall posters, and other materials describing life in the Ghetto. The collecting work began in September 1939 and ended in January 1943.

Today the discovered part of the collection, containing some 6,000 documents (some 35,000 pages), is housed in Warsaw at the Jewish Historical Institute.

Etymology
The name Oneg Shabbat means joy of the Sabbath in Hebrew and usually refers to a celebratory gathering held after Sabbath services, often with food, singing, study, discussion, and socializing. This name was selected because the group tended to meet on Shabbat to discuss the progress of their collection and documentation efforts. The form Oyneg Shabbos is Ashkenazic pronunciation.

History

The members of Oyneg Shabbos initially collected the material with the intention that they would write a book after the war about the horrors they had witnessed. The Warsaw Ghetto was sealed on November 16, 1940. As the pace of deportations increased, and it became clear that the destination was the Treblinka death camp and few Jewish Varsovians were likely to survive, Ringelblum had the archives stored in three milk cans and ten metal boxes, which were then buried in three places in the Ghetto. Two of the canisters, containing thousands of documents, were unearthed on 18 September 1946 and a further ten boxes on 1 December 1950. The third cache is rumored to be buried beneath what is now the Chinese Embassy in Warsaw but a search in 2005 failed to locate the missing archival material.

On January 19, 1942, an escaped inmate from the Chełmno extermination camp, Jacob Grojanowski, reached the Warsaw Ghetto, where he gave detailed information about the camp to the Oneg Shabbat group. His report, which became known as the Grojanowski Report, was smuggled out of the ghetto through the channels of the Polish underground, reached London and was published by June.

All but three members of the Oyneg Shabbos were murdered in the genocides. Emanuel Ringelblum escaped the ghetto, but continued to return to work on the archives. In 1944 Ringelblum and his family were discovered and were executed along with those who hid them. After the war, Rokhl Auerbakh, one of the three surviving members of Oyneg Shabes, initiated the search for and excavation of the buried chronicles.

Legacy
In 1960, students of Rabbi Kalonymus Kalman Shapira, The Piaseczno Rebbe, published the Aish Kodesh which were derashos on the parsha that the rebbe had delivered between September 1939 and July 1942 in the Warsaw Ghetto and which were discovered with the Ringelblum Archive.

In 1999, the Emanuel Ringelblum Archives were listed on the Memory of the World Register by UNESCO.

A catalog of the Ringelblum Archive was published in book form in 2009 by the United States Holocaust Memorial Museum and the Jewish Historical Institute, Warsaw; and the entire archive is also available to researchers in digital format at both institutions. The Jewish Historical Institute has published a book series summarizing parts of the archive. The first 10 volumes are: (1) Letters concerning the Holocaust (2) Children — covert teaching in the Warsaw Ghetto (3) Accounts from Kresy (4) Life and work of Gela Seksztajn (5) The Warsaw Ghetto. Everyday Life (6) The General Governorate. Accounts and Documents (7) Legacies (8) Territories annexed to the Reich: The Reich District of Danzig-West Prussia, Ciechanów district, Upper Silesia (9) Territories annexed to the Reich: Wartheland (10) Fate of Jews from Łódź (1939–1942).

In 2007, historian Samuel Kassow published Who Will Write Our History? Emanuel Ringelblum, the Warsaw Ghetto, and the Oyneg Shabbes Archive listing all accounts of the Oyneg Shabes archives that have been found. 3 Capsules were buried, two were later found after the war. The third capsule is yet to be found, some believe it to be under the Chinese Embassy in Warsaw.

References

External links 
Catalogue and guide
Warsaw Ghetto Archives (Emanuel Ringelblum Archives), Memory of the World, UNESCO
 “Let The World Read And Know” - The Oneg Shabbat Archives - Online Exhibition from Yad Vashem
 Museum of Jewish Heritage
Poetry In Hell: The complete collection of poems from the Ringelblum Archives in the original Yiddish with English translations''.
https://www.facinghistory.org/resource-library/who-will-write-our-history

Memory of the World Register
History of Warsaw
Warsaw Ghetto
Holocaust historical documents
1939 documents
1940 documents
1941 documents
1942 documents
1943 documents